The Collection is a greatest hits album of English band Talk Talk, released in 2000.

The album has been re-released various times. First released as "Talk Talk The Collection" in 2000, further versions of the album with the same track list include The Collection (2003), It's My Life: The Collection (2001) and The Ultra Selection (2001).

As with all of the band's EMI compilations until 2013, the album was not a band sanctioned release.

Track listing 
"Talk Talk"
"It's My Life"
"Without You"
"Strike Up the Band"
"Life's What You Make It"
"It's Getting Late in the Evening"
"Pictures of Bernadette"
"Happiness Is Easy"
"The Last Time"
"I Don't Believe in You"
"It's You"
"Talk Talk" (demo)
"It's So Serious"
"The Party's Over"
"Dum Dum Girl"
"Candy"

2000 greatest hits albums
Talk Talk albums
Albums produced by Colin Thurston
EMI Records compilation albums